Lee Roy Selmon's was an American casual dining restaurant chain located and founded in Florida by former NFL player Lee Roy Selmon. The concept was owned by OSI Restaurant Partners, LLC until 2008 when it was sold to MVP Holdings Tampa, Inc. owned by Outback Steakhouse founders Robert D. "Bob" Basham and Chris T. Sullivan. Lee Roy Selmon continued to work with the company through its transfer of ownership until his death in 2011. There are three locations, all of which are located in west-central Florida. It was announced on May 23, 2018, that the original location will be closing after 17 years.

Lee Roy Selmon's served Southern-style food and comfort food such as fried green tomatoes and pecan pie.

References

External links
 

Companies based in Tampa, Florida
Restaurants established in 2000
Restaurant chains in the United States
2000 establishments in Florida